On the night of August 2, 1999, a massive landslide occurred in Cherry Hills subdivision in Antipolo, Rizal province, Philippines that resulted to about 60 deaths and 378 houses buried. The landslide was primarily caused by the heavy rains associated with Typhoon Ising (Olga) and its enhancement of the southwest monsoon. The subdivision became a death trap when its foundations was filled with water and the whole complex slid down the hill on which it was built.

Overview

Topography
Cherry Hills subdivision was home to hundreds of families paying-off low cost, concrete houses. The subdivision was owned and developed by Tirso Santillan, president of Philjas Corporation. The subdivision was located in Antipolo, Rizal and was situated in an elevated terrain cut along the perches of the Sierra Madre mountains.

Besides its location on the mountain cuts, Cherry Hill was flanked by two subdivision on its either sides. The eastern summit is at elevation of 255 meters while the western side is at elevation of 233 meters. The subdivision cut from the mountain side is approximately 26 meters at its deepest.

The subdivision encompasses five hectares with paved roads. The subdivision consisted of light-roofed one or two-storey houses with hollow block wall construction that are either single-detached or row houses.

Event
Before the landslide occurred, several residents evacuated to the nearby town when cracks began manifesting on the walls of their houses. Tell-tale signs about a possible impending slide was rumored, and ominous signs of changes in elevation and ground movements have been observed.

References

 
 
 
 

Cherry Hills subdivision landslide
1999 natural disasters
1999 in the Philippines
History of Rizal
Antipolo
Cherry Hills subdivision landslide